Sequestosome-1 is a protein that in humans is encoded by the SQSTM1 gene.  Also known as the ubiquitin-binding protein p62, it is an autophagosome cargo protein that targets other proteins that bind to it for selective autophagy.  By interacting with GATA4 and targeting it for degradation, it can inhibit GATA-4 associated senescence and senescence-associated secretory phenotype.

Model organisms 

Model organisms have been used in the study of SQSTM1 function. A conditional knockout mouse line, called Sqstm1tm1a(KOMP)Wtsi was generated as part of the International Knockout Mouse Consortium program — a high-throughput mutagenesis project to generate and distribute animal models of disease to interested scientists.

Male and female animals underwent a standardized phenotypic screen to determine the effects of deletion. Twenty two tests were carried out on homozygous mutant mice and one significant abnormality was observed: females had abnormal complete blood count parameters, including an increased red blood cell distribution width and increased mean platelet volume.

Interactions 

Sequestosome 1 has been shown to interact with:

 MAP1LC3A,
 PRKCI, 
 RAD23A, 
 RIPK1, 
 TRAF6 
 TrkA,  and
 TrkB. 
 Nrf2

References

Further reading 

 
 
 
 
 
 
 
 
 
 
 
 
 
 
 
 
 
 
 Feng, Lifeng et al. “Tamoxifen activates Nrf2-dependent SQSTM1 transcription to promote endometrial hyperplasia” Theranostics vol. 7,7 1890-1900. 10 Apr. 2017, doi:10.7150/thno.19135

Genes mutated in mice